Terrifying! Art of Dying – The Last Men on Earth II is a two-disc album by the Japanese horror punk band Balzac, released in 2002.

Track listing

Personnel
 Hirosuke – vocals 
 Atsushi – guitar 
 Akio – bass guitar
 Kill – drums

Balzac (band) albums